Fernand "Ferd" Lahure (28 March 1929 – 23 March 2019) was a Luxembourgian football goalkeeper. He competed in the men's tournament at the 1952 Summer Olympics.

References

External links
 

1929 births
2019 deaths
Luxembourgian footballers
Luxembourg international footballers
Olympic footballers of Luxembourg
Footballers at the 1952 Summer Olympics
People from Differdange
Association football goalkeepers